Ricardo Miguel Martins Alves (born 9 May 1991) is a Portuguese professional footballer who plays for C.D. Tondela as either a left-back or a central defender.

Club career
Alves was born in Vila Nova de Cerveira, Viana do Castelo District. He spent his first two years as a senior in the third division with G.D. Tourizense and C.S. Marítimo's reserves, playing 25 matches (24 starts) for the latter during the 2011–12 season as they finished in 12th position but were still promoted to the Segunda Liga, being registered in the competition at the same time as several other reserve teams.

Alves made his professional debut for Marítimo B on 12 August 2012, playing the entire 1–0 away loss against Leixões S.C. and being booked in the process. His first goal in the second tier came the following month, in the 1–0 home win over Portimonense SC.

In the summer of 2014, Alves moved to the Romanian Liga I after signing with CS Concordia Chiajna. His first game in top-flight football took place on 17 August, in a 2–0 defeat away to ASA 2013 Târgu Mureș. He switched to fellow league side FC Astra Giurgiu at the end of the campaign, being rarely played during his two-year spell.

Alves returned to Portugal in June 2017, joining Leixões on a two-year contract. In the following off-season, however, he left for C.D. Tondela of the Primeira Liga on a three-year deal.

On 8 December 2018, Alves made his debut in the Portuguese top division on 8 December 2018, coming on as a first-half substitute for the injured Ricardo Costa in an eventual 0–1 home loss against S.C. Braga. He scored his first league goal on 5 January 2020, opening the 1–1 draw with Gil Vicente F.C. also at the Estádio João Cardoso.

International career
Alves won his only cap for Portugal at under-21 level on 3 June 2011, playing the second half of the 2–0 friendly victory over Austria held in Faro, Algarve.

Honours
Astra Giurgiu
Liga I: 2015–16

References

External links

Portuguese League profile 

1991 births
Living people
Sportspeople from Viana do Castelo District
Portuguese footballers
Association football defenders
Primeira Liga players
Liga Portugal 2 players
Segunda Divisão players
G.D. Tourizense players
C.S. Marítimo players
Leixões S.C. players
C.D. Tondela players
Liga I players
CS Concordia Chiajna players
FC Astra Giurgiu players
Portugal youth international footballers
Portugal under-21 international footballers
Portuguese expatriate footballers
Expatriate footballers in Romania
Portuguese expatriate sportspeople in Romania